Manfred Stohl (born 7 July 1972, in Vienna) is an Austrian rally driver who debuted in the World Rally Championship in 1991. Stohl's co-driver is fellow Austrian Ilka Minor.

Career 
Stohl ventured into rallying following the career path of his father Rudi Stohl. Stohl's first professional rally was the 1991 Rallye Côte d'Ivoire Bandama, driving an Audi 90 Quattro with Kay Gerlach as his co-driver. He took his first World Rally Championship points by finishing seventh in the same event the following year.

After several more privateer entries in the WRC, Stohl got a contract with Team Mitsubishi Ralliart Germany to compete in the FIA Cup for Drivers of Production Cars (now the Production World Rally Championship) driving a Mitsubishi Lancer Evolution. He finished third in the championship in 1997, second in 1998 and fourth in 1999, before winning the title in 2000 ahead of defending champion Gustavo Trelles.

Progressing from Group N production cars to World Rally Cars, Stohl took his first WRC points in ten years by driving his Peugeot 206 WRC to seventh place at the 2003 Wales Rally GB. In the 2004 season, driving mainly for the OMV World Rally Team, backed by Austrian oil company OMV, his best event result was sixth at the Acropolis Rally.

In 2005, Stohl continued with the OMV team now driving the Citroën Xsara WRC. He took his first podium finish with a surprise second place at the Cyprus Rally, behind Citroën Total factory driver Sébastien Loeb. In the season-ending Rally Australia, he took his second podium by finishing third. His results placed him ninth in the Drivers' World Championship.

In the 2006 season, with Henning Solberg as his team-mate, Stohl drove a Peugeot 307 WRC for the Bozian Racing-run OMV Peugeot Norway WRT. He took four podium places and finished a career-best fourth in the drivers' standings. He also became one of the few drivers to reach participation in 100 world rallies without winning one of them.

In 2007, Stohl returned to the wheel of a Xsara WRC for the OMV Kronos Citroën. After a disappointing season, in which he finished ninth in the championship and his best result was sixth place in both Mexico and Japan, OMV withdrew their support of Stohl. This left him without a full-time drive for the 2008 season. Stohl returned to WRC at 2012 Rally New Zealand, driving Ford Fiesta RS WRC for Brazil World Rally Team, replacing the regular driver Daniel Oliveira. He finished 10th in the rally.

Since disappearing from the WRC, Stohl has successfully run his own team, Stohl Racing. The team is currently responsible for developing and running Subaru Impreza WRX STi R4 cars in the Intercontinental Rally Challenge, with the crew of 2008 PWRC champion Andreas Aigner and Stohl's old partner, Ilka Minor. Meanwhile, Stohl -with a self-developed, petrol-powered Mitsubishi Lancer Evo IX- is contesting the Austrian Rally Championship (ÖRM); in 2012, he finished third overall against strong opposition, and remained winless through the season.

Racing record

Complete WRC results

PWRC results

JWRC Results

Complete FIA World Rallycross Championship results

Supercar

References

External links 

 
 RallyBase profile
 eWRC profile
 World Rally Archive profile

1972 births
Living people
Sportspeople from Vienna
Austrian rally drivers
World Rally Championship drivers
World Rallycross Championship drivers
Hyundai Motorsport drivers